Mark Jonathan Moore (born 25 April 1961) was the headmaster (Head of College) of Clifton College in Bristol from 2005-2015.

Education and teaching 
Moore was educated at Wolverhampton Grammar School and read English at Downing College, Cambridge.

Moore was previously the Head of English and the Director of University Entrance at Radley College and taught at Marlborough College and Eton College.

Sporting achievements
At Cambridge, Moore captained the university Eton Fives team and was the national Eton Fives champion.

References

External links
 BBC news article on Mark Moore
 Clifton College website
 Good Schools Guide

Living people
Schoolteachers from the West Midlands
Headmasters of Clifton College
People educated at Wolverhampton Grammar School
Alumni of Downing College, Cambridge
1961 births
Teachers at Eton College